The following is a listing of the clinical and university hospitals in Poland:
 Medical University of Białystok
 Uniwersytecki Szpital Kliniczny, Białystok
 Uniwersytecki Dziecięcy Szpital Kliniczny im. dr Ludwika Zamenhofa, Białystok
 Collegium Medicum in Bydgoszcz of the Nicolaus Copernicus University
 Szpital Uniwersytecki nr 1 im. dr Antoniego Jurasza, Bydgoszcz
 Szpital Uniwersytecki nr 2 im. dr Jana Biziela, Bydgoszcz
 Wojskowy Szpital Kliniczny z Polikliniką, Bydgoszcz
 Collegium Medicum of the Nicolaus Copernicus University in Ciechocinek
 Uzdrowiskowy Szpital Kliniczny, Ciechocinek

 Medical University of Gdańsk
 Uniwersyteckie Centrum Kliniczne, Gdańsk
 Medical University of Gdańsk in Gdynia
 Uniwersyteckie Centrum Medycyny Morskiej i Tropikalnej, Gdynia
 Medical University of Silesia in Katowice
 Centralny Szpital Kliniczny im. prof. Kornela Gibińskiego, Katowice
 Samodzielny Publiczny Szpital Kliniczny im. Andrzeja Mielęckiego, Katowice
 Samodzielny Publiczny Szpital Kliniczny nr 5 - Szpital okulistyczny, Katowice
 Górnośląskie Centrum Zdrowia Dziecka, Katowice
 Górnośląskie Centrum Medyczne, Katowice
 Jagiellonian University Medical College
 Szpital Uniwersytecki, Kraków
 Uniwersytecka Klinika Stomatologiczna, Kraków
 Uniwersytecki Szpital Dziecięcy, Kraków
 Wojskowy Szpital Kliniczny z Polikliniką, Kraków
 Medical University of Lublin in Lublin
 Samodzielny Publiczny Szpital Kliniczny nr 1, Lublin
 Samodzielny Publiczny Szpital Kliniczny nr 4, Lublin
 Dziecięcy Szpital Kliniczny im. prof. Antoniego Gębali, Lublin
 Wojskowy Szpital Kliniczny z Polikliniką, Lublin

 Medical University of Łódź
 Central Clinical Hospital of the Medical University in Łódź,
 Uniwersytecki Szpital Kliniczny nr 1 im. Norberta Barlickiego, Łódź
 Uniwersytecki Szpital Kliniczny nr 2 im. Wojskowej Akademii Medycznej, Łódź
 Uniwersytecki Szpital Kliniczny nr 3 im. dr Seweryna Sterlinga, Łódź
 Uniwersytecki Szpital Kliniczny nr 4 im. Marii Konopnickiej, Łódź
 Uniwersytecki Szpital Kliniczny nr 5 im. gen. dyw. Bolesława Szareckiego, Łódź
 Uniwersytecki Szpital Kliniczny nr 6 – Instytut Stomatologii, Łódź
 Medical Sciences Faculty of the University of Warmia and Mazury, Olsztyn
 Uniwersytecki Szpital Kliniczny, Olsztyn
 Centrum Medyczne Kształcenia Podyplomowego, Otwock
 Samodzielny Publiczny Szpital Kliniczny im. prof. Adama Grucy, Otwock
 Pomeranian Medical University
 Samodzielny Publiczny Szpital Kliniczny nr 1 im. prof. Tadeusza Sokołowskiego, Police
 Poznań University of Medical Sciences
 Szpital Kliniczny Przemienienia Pańskiego, Poznań
 Szpital Kliniczny im. Heliodora Święcickiego, Poznań
 Ginekologiczno-Położniczy Szpital Kliniczny, Poznań
 Ortopedyczno-Rehabilitacyjny Szpital Kliniczny im. Wiktora Degi, Poznań
 Szpital Kliniczny im. Karola Jonschera, Poznań
 Specjalistyczny Szpital Kliniczny Uniwersytetu Medycznego, Poznań
 Pomeranian Medical University
 Samodzielny Publiczny Szpital Kliniczny nr 1 im. prof. Tadeusza Sokołowskiego, Szczecin
 Samodzielny Publiczny Szpital Kliniczny nr 2, Szczecin

 Medical University of Warsaw
 Samodzielny Publiczny Centralny Szpital Kliniczny, Warsaw
 Samodzielny Publiczny Dziecięcy Szpital Kliniczny, Warsaw
 Samodzielny Publiczny Kliniczny Szpital Okulistyczny, Warsaw
 Szpital Kliniczny Dzieciątka Jezus, Warsaw
 Szpital Kliniczny im. Księżnej Anny Mazowieckiej, Warsaw
 Centrum Medyczne Kształcenia Podyplomowego, Warsaw
 Samodzielny Publiczny Szpital Kliniczny im. prof. Witolda Orłowskiego, Warsaw
Ministerstwo Spraw Wewnętrznych i Administracji, Warsaw
 Centralny Szpital Kliniczny Ministerstwa Spraw Wewnętrznych i Administracji, Warsaw
Wojskowy Instytut Medyczny, Warsaw
 Centralny Szpital Kliniczny Ministerstwa Obrony Narodowej, Warsaw

 Wrocław Medical University, Wrocław
 Samodzielny Publiczny Szpital Kliniczny nr 1, Wrocław
 Akademicki Szpital Kliniczny im. Jana Mikulicza-Radeckiego, Wrocław
 Akademicka Klinika Stomatologiczna, Wrocław
 Siły Zbrojne Rzeczypospolitej Polskiej, Wrocław
 Wojskowy Szpital Kliniczny z Polikliniką, Wrocław
 Medical University of Silesia in Katowice
 Samodzielny Publiczny Szpital Kliniczny nr 1 im. prof. Stanisława Szyszko, Zabrze
 Samodzielny Publiczny Szpital Kliniczny nr 3, Zabrze
 Jagiellonian University Medical College, Zakopane
 Uniwersytecki Szpital Ortopedyczno-Rehabilitacyjny, Zakopane

Selected public and other hospitals
 Specialist Hospital in Jasło
 Children's Clinical Hospital, Kraków
 Krakowski Szpital Specjalistyczny im. Jana Pawła II, Kraków
 University Hospital, Kraków
 Państwowy Szpital Kliniczny Nr4, Lublin
 University Hospital, Łódź
 SPZOZ, Puławy
 The County Hospital, Sanok
 Carolina Medical Center in Warsaw
 Children’s Memorial Health Institute, Warsaw
 Wojewódzki Szpital Specjalistyczny Chorób Płuc, Zakopane
 Medicover Hospital, Warsaw
 Wojewódzki Szpital Podkarpacki im. Jana Pawa II w Krośnie, Krosno
 Wojewódzki Szpital Zakaźny w Warszawie (Warsaw)
 Wojewódzki Szpital Zespolony, Nowy Sącz
 Szpital Św. Wojciecha Poznań

See also
 Health care in Poland

References

Poland
 
Medical and health organisations based in Poland
Hospitals
Poland